Theodore Roosevelt (1858–1919) was the 26th President of the United States (1901–1909) and also served as Governor of New York and Vice President. He is known for becoming a leading spokesman for his version of  progressivism after 1890. However, author Daniel Ruddy argues in his book Theodore the Great: Conservative Crusader that Roosevelt was actually a "populist conservative" and a "Hamiltonian"—a conservative in the eighteenth century sense of the word. Similarly, Francis Fukuyama identifies Roosevelt, together with Alexander Hamilton, as part of a tradition of a strong-state conservatism in the United States.

Roosevelt has been the main figure identified with progressive conservatism as a political tradition. Roosevelt stated that he had "always believed that wise progressivism and wise conservatism go hand in hand".

Professor Richard Heffner of Rutgers University noted about Roosevelt that his New Nationalism "sought Social Justice by extending the powers of the central government", which Roosevelt believed to be the steward of the public welfare.

Notable Achievements and Recommendations
The book Theodore Roosevelt's Confession of Faith Before the Progressive National Convention lists the following 33 past achievements and 8 recommendations for the future from Roosevelt himself:

1 Extension of Forest Reserve
2 National Irrigation Act
3 Improvement of waterways and reservation of water power
4 Hepburn Rate Act
5 Employers Liability Act
6 Safety Appliance Act
7 Regulation of railroad employees hours of labor
8 Establishment of Department of Commerce and Labor
9 Pure Food and Drugs Act
10 Federal meat inspection
11 Inspection of packing houses
12 Navy nearly doubled in tonnage and greatly increased in efficiency
13 Battle ship fleet sent around the world
14 State militia brought into co ordination with army
15 Canal Zone acquired and work of excavation pushed with increased energy
16 Development of civil self government in insular possessions
17 Second intervention in Cuba Cuba restored to the Cubans
18 Finances of Santo Domingo straightened out
19 Alaska boundary dispute settled
20 Reorganization of the Consular Service
21 Settlement of the coal strike of 1902
22 The Government upheld in Northern Securities decision
23 Conviction of post office grafters and public land thieves
24 Directed investigation of the Sugar Trust custom frauds and the resultant prosecutions
25 Directed prosecution of railroads and other corporations for violation of Sherman Anti Trust Law (the Harriman, Tobacco, and Standard Oil suits)
26 Keeping the door of China open to American commerce
27 Bringing about the settlement of the Russo Japanese war by the Treaty of Portsmouth
28 Called a conference on the welfare of dependent children 
29 Negotiating twenty four treaties of general arbitration
30 Reduction of interest bearing debt by more than 90 000 000
31 Paving the way for tariff revision
32 Inauguration of movement for conservation of natural resources
33 Inauguration of movement for improvement of conditions of country life
1 Reform of the financial system
2 Inheritance tax
3 Income tax
4 Passage of a new employers liability act to meet objections raised by the Supreme Court
5 Parcels post
6 Revision of the Sherman Anti Trust Act
7 Legislation to prevent over capitalization stock watering etc of common carriers
8 Legislation compelling incorporation under Federal laws of corporations engaged in interstate commerce

Square Deal 

Roosevelt while ex-president introduced the phrase "Square Deal" to describe his progressive views in August 1910. Some ideas were later picked up by liberal Democrats during Franklin D. Roosevelt's New Deal. However, about two-thirds of his supporters in 1912 opposed the New Deal.:  — Practical equality of opportunity for all citizens, when we achieve it, will have two great results. First, every man will have a fair chance to make of himself all that in him lies; to reach the highest point to which his capacities, unassisted by special privilege of his own and unhampered by the special privilege of others, can carry him, and to get for himself and his family substantially what he has earned. Second, equality of opportunity means that the commonwealth will get from every citizen the highest service of which he is capable. No man who carries the burden of the special privileges of another can give to the commonwealth that service to which it is fairly entitled.
 — I stand for the square deal. But when I say that I am for the square deal, I mean not merely that I stand for fair play under the present rules of the game, but that I stand for having those rules changed so as to work for a more substantial equality of opportunity and of reward for equally good service ... When I say I want a square deal for the poor man, I do not mean that I want a square deal for the man who remains poor because he has not got the energy to work for himself. If a man who has had a chance will not make good, then he has got to quit ... Now, this means that our government, National and State, must be freed from the sinister influence or control of special interests. Exactly as the special interests of cotton and slavery threatened our political integrity before the Civil War, so now the great special business interests too often control and corrupt the men and methods of government for their own profit. We must drive the special interests out of politics ... For every special interest is entitled to justice, but not one is entitled to a vote in Congress, to a voice on the bench, or to representation in any public office. The Constitution guarantees protection to property, and we must make that promise good. But it does not give the right of suffrage to any corporation. The true friend of property, the true conservative, is he who insists that property shall be the servant and not the master of the commonwealth; who insists that the creature of man's making shall be the servant and not the master of the man who made it. The citizens of the United States must effectively control the mighty commercial forces which they have themselves called into being.

New Nationalism 

According to the Theodore Roosevelt Association and Encyclopedia Britannica, Theodore Roosevelt's strong belief in social justice is embodied in his proposals for a "New Nationalism".

The central issue he argued was government protection of human welfare and property rights, but he also argued that human welfare was more important than property rights.  He insisted that only a powerful federal government could regulate the economy and guarantee justice, and that a President can succeed in making his economic agenda successful only if he makes the protection of human welfare his highest priority.

In terms of policy, Roosevelt's platform included a broad range of social and political reforms advocated by progressives.

Conservationist 

In a speech that Roosevelt gave at Osawatomie, Kansas on August 31, 1910, he outlined his views on conservation of the lands of the United States:

Corporate regulations 
For the first time in American history, through the Hepburn Act, the power to enact Price controls was passed into law.  The act was strongly endorsed by the President, and its enactment was considered a major legislative victory for the Roosevelt Administration.

In the Eighth Annual Message to Congress (1908), Roosevelt mentioned the need for federal government to regulate interstate corporations using the Interstate Commerce Clause, also mentioning how these corporations fought federal control by appealing to states' rights:  — Of course there are many sincere men who now believe in unrestricted individualism in business, just as there were formerly many sincere men who believed in slavery – that is, in the unrestricted right of an individual to own another individual. These men do not by themselves have great weight, however. The effective fight against adequate government control and supervision of individual, and especially of corporate, wealth engaged in interstate business is chiefly done under cover; and especially under cover of an appeal to States' rights. ... The chief reason, among the many sound and compelling reasons, that led to the formation of the National Government was the absolute need that the Union, and not the several States, should deal with interstate and foreign commerce; and the power to deal with interstate commerce was granted absolutely and plenarily to the central government ... The proposal to make the National Government supreme over, and therefore to give it complete control over, the railroads and other instruments of interstate commerce is merely a proposal to carry out to the letter one of the prime purposes, if not the prime purpose, for which the Constitution was founded. It does not represent centralization. It represents merely the acknowledgement of the patent fact that centralization has already come in business ... 
 — I believe that the more far-sighted corporations are themselves coming to recognize the unwisdom of the violent hostility they have displayed during the last few years to regulation and control by the National Government of combinations [monopolies] engaged in interstate business. The truth is that we who believe in this movement of asserting and exercising a genuine control, in the public interest, over these great corporations have to contend against two sets of enemies, who, though nominally opposed to one another, are really allies in preventing a proper solution of the problem. There are, first, the big corporation men, and the extreme individualists among business men, who genuinely believe in utterly unregulated business – that is, in the reign of plutocracy; and, second, the men who, being blind to the economic movements of the day, believe in a movement of repression rather than of regulation of corporations, and who denounce both the power of the railroads and the exercise of the Federal power which alone can really control the railroads.

After his term as president concluded, Roosevelt worked to publish an autobiography.  In his autobiography, Roosevelt explained his belief on the issue.  He wrote:
I have always believed that it would also be necessary to give the National Government complete power over the organization and capitalization of all business concerns engaged in inter-State commerce.

Views on civilization 
In The Winning of the West (1889–1896), Roosevelt's frontier thesis stressed a struggle between "civilization" and "savagery". Excerpts:
 "The settler and pioneer have at bottom had justice on their side; this great continent could not have been kept as nothing but a game preserve for squalid savages"
 "The most ultimately righteous of all wars is a war with savages, though it is apt to be also the most terrible and inhuman"
 "American and Indian, Boer and Zulu, Cossack and Tartar, New Zealander and Maori,in each case the victor, horrible though many of his deeds are, has laid deep the foundations for the future greatness of a mighty people"
 "it is of incalculable importance that America, Australia, and Siberia should pass out of the hands of their red, black, and yellow aboriginal owners, and become the heritage of the dominant world races"
 "The world would have halted had it not been for the Teutonic conquests in alien lands; but the victories of Moslem over Christian have always proved a curse in the end. Nothing but sheer evil has come from the victories of Turk and Tartar"

Race relations 
On August 13 and 14, 1906, Brownsville, Texas was the site of what has come to be known as the Brownsville affair. Racial tensions were high between white townsfolk and black infantrymen stationed at Fort Brown. On the night of August 13, one white bartender was killed and a white police officer was wounded by rifle shots in the street. Townsfolk, including the mayor, accused the infantrymen as the murderers. The soldiers kept silence and refused orders to tell what happened. Roosevelt dishonorably discharged the entire 167 member regiment due to their accused "conspiracy of silence". Further investigations in the 1970s found that the black infantrymen were not at fault and the Nixon administration reversed all of the dishonorable discharges.

On the other hand, Roosevelt felt that the equality for the black race would come through progress from one generation to the next. For this, he was lauded by liberal whites and was received as the usher of a new era in the black community.  William McGill, a black preacher in Tennessee, wrote: "The administration of President Roosevelt is to the Negro what the heart is to the body. It has pumped life blood into every artery of the Negro in this country". Pope Leo XIII remarked approvingly of Roosevelt's determination "to seek equality of treatment of all the races".

Roosevelt wrote to a friend that regarding the difficult issue of race relations, "I have not been able to think out any solution of the terrible problem offered by the presence of the Negro on this continent, but of one thing I am sure, and that is that inasmuch as he is here and can neither be killed nor driven away, the only wise and honorable and Christian thing to do is to treat each black man and each white man strictly on his merits as a man, giving him no more and no less than he shows himself worthy to have". Additionally, Roosevelt risked outrage (and perhaps physical harm) while speaking to a heavily armed crowd in Butte, Montana during his 1903 Western tour: "I fought beside colored troops at Santiago [Cuba], and I hold that if a man is good enough to be put up and shot at then he is good enough for me to do what I can to get him a square deal".

In spite of his numerous accomplishments when it came to race relations, Roosevelt, as well as many Progressives of that era, still had an overall condescending and paternalistic view of African Americans. In private, Roosevelt still used racial epithets and in a letter to a friend, Roosevelt wrote that “as a race and in the mass they are altogether inferior to  whites”. Roosevelt believed that Jim Crow was a better solution than turmoil, and Roosevelt once stated that “The white man who can be of most use to the colored man is the colored man's neighbor. It is the southern people themselves who must and can solve the difficulties that exist in the South”. However, Roosevelt did believe that environment and culture could modify one's heredity. Roosevelt did appoint “colored men of good repute and standing” to some federal jobs.

Perhaps his attitude is best understood in comparison to those of others in his time, who accused him of "mingling and mongrelization" of the white race; notably Democratic Senator Benjamin Tillman of South Carolina, who commented on Roosevelt's dining with Booker T. Washington: "The action of President Roosevelt in entertaining that nigger will necessitate our killing a thousand niggers in the South before they learn their place again".

Historical views 
Roosevelt's definitive 1882 book The Naval War of 1812 was the standard work on the topic for two generations and is still extensively quoted. Roosevelt undertook extensive and original research, computing British and American man-of-war broadside throw weights. However, Pringle says his biographies Thomas Hart Benton (1887) and Gouverneur Morris (1888) are hastily written and superficial. His four-volume history of the frontier titled The Winning of the West (1889–1896) had some impact on historiography as it presented a highly original version of the frontier thesis elaborated upon by his friend Frederick Jackson Turner in 1893.

Roosevelt argued the frontier conditions created a new race: the American people that replaced the "scattered savage tribes, whose life was but a few degrees less meaningless, squalid, and ferocious than that of the wild beasts with whom they held joint ownership". He believed "the conquest and settlement by the whites of the Indian lands was necessary to the greatness of the race and to the well-being of civilized mankind". His many articles in upscale magazines provided a much-needed income. He was later chosen president of the American Historical Association.

Direct election of Senators 
The direct election of senators (which later became the 17th amendment) was an important initiative for progressives of the era, with Roosevelt being among the supporters of the idea. He spoke frequently on the campaign trail about the issue and it is included in the 1912 platform of the Progressive Party.

Taxation and trade 
Roosevelt believed that in his day many of the corporate magnates and powerful trust titans amassed their wealth in ill-gotten ways. As such, he viewed the inheritance tax as well as income tax initiatives as an important part of his progressive views.  He also believed that "free trade" was pernicious, and aligned with other Republicans in his day on the need for tariffs.

Trade and tariffs 
Generally, Roosevelt favored the policy of the protective tariff.  However, he saw how destructive the issue was while it ripped the Republican party apart, so he generally stayed away from the topic.

Free trade, however, was an issue that he was an outspoken opponent of.  He wrote "Thank God I am not a free-trader.  In this country pernicious indulgence in the doctrine of free trade seems inevitably to produce fatty degeneration of the moral fibre."

Inheritance tax 

In his well known work The Man with the Muck Rake, he declared:
As a matter of personal conviction, and without pretending to discuss the details or formulate the system, I feel that we shall ultimately have to consider the adoption of some such scheme as that of a progressive tax on all fortunes, beyond a certain amount, either given in life or devised or bequeathed upon death to any individual-a tax so framed as to put it out of the power of the owner of one of these enormous fortunes to hand on more than a certain amount to any one individual; the tax of course, to be imposed by the national and not the state government. Such taxation should, of course, be aimed merely at the inheritance or transmission in their entirety of those fortunes swollen beyond all healthy limits.

Income tax 

Roosevelt supported gradual income taxation on citizens instead of a system of tariffs. In his 1907 State of the Union speech, he said:
A graduated income tax of the proper type would be a desirable feature of Federal taxation, and it is to be hoped that one may be devised which the Supreme Court will declare constitutional. The inheritance tax, however, is both a far better method of taxation, and far more important for the purpose of having the fortunes of the country bear in proportion to their increase in size a corresponding increase and burden of taxation.

He spent years calling for income taxation, including during his run for the presidency in 1912 in his New Nationalism speech.

Living Wage
As a part of Roosevelt's mandate for social justice, he believed in the creation of a Living Wage.  The living wage was a part of the platform of the Progressive Party (United States, 1912), as well as a part of Roosevelt's major speech to the Progressive party, in which he said:
We stand for a living wage. Wages are subnormal if they fail to provide a living for those who devote their time and energy to industrial occupations. The monetary equivalent of a living wage varies according to local conditions, but must include enough to secure the elements of a normal standard of living--a standard high enough to make morality possible, to provide for education and recreation, to care for immature members of the family, to maintain the family during periods of sickness, and to permit of reasonable saving for old age.

Immigration policy
As president, Roosevelt agreed to concessions whereby the United States would not impose restrictions on Japanese immigration and Japan would not allow further emigration to the United States, which was known as the "Gentlemen's Agreement".

In 1894, Roosevelt wrote:
"We must Americanize in every way, in speech, in political ideas and principles, and in their way of looking at relations between church and state. We welcome the German and the Irishman who becomes an American. We have no use for the German or Irishman who remains such ... He must revere only our flag, not only must it come first, but no other flag should even come second".

Language
In 1907, Roosevelt wrote, "We have room for but one language in this country, and that is the English language, for we intend to see that the crucible turns our people out as Americans, of American nationality, and not as dwellers in a polyglot boarding house."

Foreign policy beliefs

In the analysis by Henry Kissinger, Theodore Roosevelt was the first president to develop the guideline that it was America's duty to make its enormous power and potential influence felt globally. The idea of being a passive "city on the hill" model that others could look up to, he rejected. Roosevelt, trained in biology, was a social darwinist who believed in survival of the fittest.  The international world in his view was a realm of violence and conflict. The United States had  all the economic and geographical potential to be the fittest nation on the globe.  The United States had a duty to act decisively. For example, in terms of the Monroe Doctrine, America had to prevent European incursions in the Western Hemisphere. But there was more, as he expressed in his famous Roosevelt Corollary to the Monroe Doctrine: the U.S. had to be the policeman of the region because unruly, corrupt smaller nations had to be controlled, and if United States did not do it, European powers would in fact intervene and develop their own base of power in the hemisphere in contravention to the Monroe Doctrine.

Roosevelt was a realist and a conservative. He deplored many of the increasingly popular idealistic liberal themes, such as were promoted by William Jennings Bryan, the anti-imperialists, and Woodrow Wilson. Kissinger says he rejected the efficacy of international law. Roosevelt argue that if a country could not protect its own interests, the international community could not help very much. He ridiculed disarmament proposals that were increasingly common. He saw no likelihood of an international power capable of checking wrongdoing on a major scale. As for world government: I regard the Wilson–Bryan attitude of trusting to fantastic peace treaties, too impossible promises, to all kinds of scraps of paper without any backing in efficient force, as abhorrent. It is infinitely better for a nation and for the world to have the Frederick the Great and Bismarck tradition as regards foreign policy than to have the Bryan or Bryan–Wilson attitude as a permanent national attitude.... A milk-and-water righteousness unbacked by force is...as wicked as and even more mischievous than force divorced from righteousness. 

On the positive side, Roosevelt favored spheres of influence, whereby one great power would generally prevail, such as the United States in the Western Hemisphere or Great Britain in the Indian subcontinent. Japan fit that role and he approved. However he had deep distrust of both Germany and Russia.

Imperialism
Theodore Roosevelt is consistently regarded as an imperialist by historians.   As noted by the U.S. Naval Institute, he "subsequently presided over the globalization of American policy", and he held a much more expansive view of the United States on the global stage including a continued presence in the Philippines and the Panama Canal project.

See also
 Foreign policy of the Theodore Roosevelt administration
 Roosevelt Republican

Notes

References

Further reading 
 . online
 .
 .
 Brinkley, Douglas and Dennis Holland. The Wilderness Warrior: Theodore Roosevelt and the Crusade for America (2015), environmentalism.
 Burton, David H. Theodore Roosevelt: Confident Imperialist 
 Coletta, Paolo E. “The Diplomacy of Theodore Roosevelt and William Howard Taft.” In American Foreign Relations: A Historiographical Review, edited by Gerald K. Haines and Samuel J. Walker, 91–114. (Greenwood Press, 1981).
 Collin, Richard H. "Symbiosis versus Hegemony: New Directions in the Foreign Relations Historiography of Theodore Roosevelt and William Howard Taft." Diplomatic History 19.3 (1995): 473–497. online
 Cooper, John Milton. The warrior and the priest: Woodrow Wilson and Theodore Roosevelt (Harvard University Press, 1983). online
 Dalton, Kathleen. "Changing Interpretations of Theodore Roosevelt and the Progressive Era." in A Companion to the Gilded Age and Progressive Era ed. by Christopher M. Nichols and Nancy C. Unger  (2017) pp: 296–307.
 .
 De Vries, George. (1968) "Theodore roosevelt: an american synthesis." Midcontinent American Studies Journal 9.2 (1968): 70–80. online
 Dorsey, Leroy G. We Are All Americans, Pure and Simple: Theodore Roosevelt and the Myth of Americanism ( of Alabama Press, 2013).
 Gable, John. “The Man in the Arena of History: The Historiography of Theodore Roosevelt” in Theodore Roosevelt: Many-Sided American, eds. Natalie Naylor, Douglas Brinkley and John Gable (Interlaken, NY: Hearts of the Lakes, 1992), 613–643.
 
 Greenberg, David. "Theodore Roosevelt and the image of presidential activism." Social Research 78.4 (2011): 1057–1088. online
 Hull, Katy. "Hero, Champion of Social Justice, Benign Friend: Theodore Roosevelt in American Memory." European journal of American studies 13.13-2 (2018). online
 Lucas, Stephen E. "Theodore Roosevelt's “the man with the muck‐rake”: A reinterpretation." Quarterly Journal of Speech 59.4 (1973): 452-462.
 Maciag, Drew. "Theodore Roosevelt: Blazing Forward, Looking Backward." in Edmund Burke in America (Cornell University Press, 2013) pp. 122–142.
 
 
 Murphy, Gary. "“Mr. Roosevelt is Guilty”: Theodore Roosevelt and the Crusade for Constitutionalism, 1910–1912." Journal of American Studies 36.3 (2002): 441-457.
 Murphy, Richard. “Theodore Roosevelt.” in A History and Criticism of American Public Address. Vol. 3  Ed. Marie Kathryn Hochmuth. (Longman's, Green and Co, 1955) pp: 313–364.
 Nester, William R. Theodore Roosevelt and the Art of American Power: An American for All Time (Rowman & Littlefield, 2019).
 Ricard, Serge. "The State of Theodore Roosevelt Studies" (H-DIPLO 2014) online.
 Ricard, Serge. ed. A Companion to Theodore Roosevelt (2011) new essays by scholars excerpt.
 
 Ruiz, George W. "The Ideological Convergence of Theodore Roosevelt and Woodrow Wilson." Presidential Studies Quarterly (1989): 159–177. online
 Thompson, John M. Great Power Rising: Theodore Roosevelt and the Politics of US Foreign Policy (Oxford UP, 2019).
 Yarbrough, Jean M. Theodore Roosevelt and the American Political Tradition (UP of Kansas, 2012). 337 pp; argues TR was not a conservative.

Primary sources 
 , Roosevelt's opinions on many issues; online version at Theodore Roosevelt; 674 pages; over 4,000 quotations arranged alphabetically by topic; available on CD-ROM.
 O'Toole, Patricia, ed. In the Words of Theodore Roosevelt: Quotations from the Man in the Arena (2012).  excerpt.
 .
 .
 , 20 vol.; 18,000 pages containing most of Roosevelt's speeches, books and essays, but not his letters; a CD-ROM edition is available; some of Roosevelt's books are available online through Project Bartleby.
 .
 .

Political positions
Political positions of state governors of the United States
Political positions of presidents of the United States
Roosevelt, Theodore
Progressive conservatism